Jacob Andersen is a Danish singer, who gained fame when he won the 2004 talent competition Stjerne for en aften ("Star for a night").

In 2007, Jacob Andersen participated in the Dansk Melodi Grand Prix, the Danish national selection for the Eurovision Song Contest. He performed the song "Listen to Love" at the semi-final.  In the final on February 10, 2007 he finished 5th with 12 points.

Sources
"Stjerne for en aften" profile
"Dansk Melodi Grand Prix" profile
B.T. interview

Danish male singers
Dansk Melodi Grand Prix contestants
Living people
Year of birth missing (living people)